Saran may refer to the following people
Given name
 Saran (director) (born 1975), Indian film director
Saran Sérémé (born 1968), Burkinabé politician

Surname
Daulat Ram Saran (1924–2011), Indian statesman
Mohinder Saran, Canadian politician 
Murat Šaran (1949–2021), Bosnian football player
 Richard Saran (1852–1925), German architect
 Shriya Saran Bhatnagar  (born 1982), Indian film actress and model
 Shyam Saran (born 1946), Indian politician
Suvir Saran (born 1972), Indian chef, cookbook author and educator
Tribhuvaneshwar Saran Singh Deo(born 1952), Health minister of Chattishgarh and Head of the royal family of Surguja.
Brij Bhushan Sharan Singh, Indian politician and Member of Parliament.